Women's League may refer to:

Sports

Association football 
 Bulgarian Women's League, top level league of women's football in Bulgaria
 Danish Women's League, top-flight semi-professional football league in Denmark
 Indian Women's League, top-tier professional football league in the Indian football league system
 FD Women's League, top division women's football league in the Indian National Capital Territory of Delhi
 Goa Women's League, top division women's football league in the Indian state of Goa
 Karnataka Women's League, top division women's football league in the Indian state of Karnataka
 Kerala Women's League, top division women's football league in the Indian state of Kerala
 Manipur Women's League, top division women's football league in the Indian state of Manipur
 Odisha Women's League (previously known as FAO Women's League), top division women's football league of the Indian state of Odisha
 Tamil Nadu Women's League, top division women's football league of the Indian state of Tamil Nadu
 Kuwaiti Women's League, first official women's football championship in Kuwait
 Latvian Women's League, top level women's football league of Latvia
 Libyan Women's League, top flight of women's association football in Libya
 Liga 1 Putri, top-flight women's football league in Indonesia
 Ligat Nashim, Israeli women's football league
 Malawi Women's League (also called Elite Women's League), top flight of association football in Malawi
 Maltese Women's League, top-level women's league of football in Malta
 Montenegrin Women's League, top level women's football league of Montenegro
  (former name for Kansallinen Liiga), professional association football league in Finland
 National Women's League (former name of Ghana Women's Premier League), top division league for women's football in Ghana
 National Women's League (Nepal), top division of the All Nepal Football Association in Nepal
 National Women's League (former name of New Zealand Women's National League), top level women's football league in New Zealand
 PFF Women's League, top-flight of association football in the Philippines
 SAFA Women's League, top flight of women's association football in South Africa
 Seychelles Women's League, top flight of women's association football in Seychelles
 Slovenian Women's League, association football league in Slovenia
 Thai Women's League, professional association football league
 Ukrainian Women's League, also known as the Zhinocha Liha, part of Ukrainian professional football clubs
 Welsh Premier Women's League (former name of Adran Premier), top level women's football league in Wales
 Women's League of Ireland (former name of Women's National League (Ireland)), top-level league for women's association football in the Republic of Ireland
 Women's League Soccer, regional semi-professional women's soccer league in the United States (2011–2013)
 ÖFB-Frauenliga, top level women's football league of Austria

Other sports
 Alberta Footy Women's League, Australian rules football league in North America
 American Football Women's League, defunct women's American football league (2002–2003)
 KvindeLigaen (ice hockey), premier women's ice hockey league in Denmark
 Naisten Liiga (ice hockey), top ice hockey league in the Finnish league system
 SANFL Women's League, state-level women's Australian rules football league in South Australia
 Women's League (Switzerland), top ice hockey league in the Swiss Women's Hockey League system

Other 
 African National Congress Women's League, auxiliary women's political organization of the African National Congress of South Africa
 Catholic Women's League, Roman Catholic lay organization in England and Wales
 North Korea Democratic Women's League (former name of Socialist Women's Union of Korea), mass organization for women in North Korea
 Turkish Women's League of America, women's equality and justice organization comprising Americans of Turkish origin
 Women's League for Israel, volunteer social welfare organization in Israel
 Women's League for the Spread of Co-operation, auxiliary organisation of the co-operative movement in the United Kingdom
 Women's League of Burma, community-based organisation working on the rights of women from Burma that is involved in constitution-drafting activities

See also
 Women's Hockey League (disambiguation)